The following lists events that happened during 1844 in Chile.

Incumbents
President of Chile: Manuel Bulnes

Events 
date unknown - Spain recognizes the independence of Chile.

Births
5 February - Agustín Ross (d. 1926)
15 July - Enrique Mac Iver (d. 1922)

Deaths
9 April - José Miguel Infante (b. 1778)
13 September - Bernardino Bilbao Beyner (b. 1788)

References 

 
1840s in Chile
Chile
Chile